Samara State Technical University (Samara Polytech) - Is a higher educational institution in Samara, Russia.

Structure of the university 

 Faculties: Mechanical Engineering Metallurgy and Transport, Petroleum Engineering, Chemical Engineering, Electrical Engineering, Engineering and Technology, Heat Power Engineering, Food Production Technologies, Engineering Economics;
Institute of Social and Human Sciences and Technologies and Automation and Information Technology Institute;
Architecture and Civil Engineering Academy which includes: Architectural Engineering Faculty, Design Faculty, Industrial Civil Construction Faculty, Engineering System and Environment Construction Faculty, Construction Technology Faculty;
33 research centers including International Research Center for Theoretical Materials Science;
Scientific and Technical Library;
United editorial office "Technopolis of the Volga region";
10 diverse student clubs: The literary club, Student council, Military-patriotic club "Tayfoon" etc.;
Health and fitness centers;
8 Dormitories for students.

History 
On July 3, 1914 (old style) Nikolay the II on the yacht "Shtandart" approved the "Law on the establishment of the Polytechnic Institute in the city of Samara". The law was published in the Assembly of Laws and Government Decisions under No. 180.

1934 - Three previously independent technical colleges became a single Mid-Volga industrial institute. In the Middle Volga Industrial Institute joined the Faculty of Chemistry as the Faculty of Chemical Technology.

1935 - The Middle Volga Institute got a new name - Kuibyshev Industrial Institute named after V.V. Kuibyshev

1962 - Kuibyshev Industrial Institute was reorganized into the Kuibyshev Polytechnic Institute.

1980 - according to the Decree of the USSR Supreme Soviet Presidium the Kuibyshev Polytechnic Institute is awarded the Order of the Red Banner of Labor

1991 - Kuibyshev Polytechnic Institute was renamed to Samara Polytechnic Institute and the year later received the status of Samara State Technical University (SSTU)

2015 - The scientific council of SSTU has made a decision to merge with the Samara State University of Architecture and Civil Engineering (SSUACE). The corresponding order was signed by the Minister of Education and Science of the Russian Federation on December 30.

2016 - SSTU has become one of the 11 flagship universities of the country

2017 - The establishing of "Samara Polytech. Flagship University" Brand. Implementation of strategic projects

Notable alumni 
Viktor Chernomyrdin, Minister of the USSR Gas Industry, Chairman of the Russian Federation Government, Ambassador Extraordinary and Plenipotentiary of Russia in Ukraine

Rem Vyakhirev, Deputy Minister of the USSR Gas Industry, Board Chairman of "Gazprom", laureate of the USSR State Prize, State Prize of the Russian Federation in the field of science

Dmitry Azarov, Head of Samara in 2010 – 2014, Member of the Federation Council of the Federal Assembly of the Russian Federation, since September 2017 – Acting for the Governor of the Samara region.

Rankings and general information 

 Ranked #146 among 1172 Russian universities (by Webometrics Ranking of World Universities)
 Ranked #54 among 186 Russian universities (by ARES Academic Ranking of World Universities-European Standard)
 Ranked #201-210 among Russian Universities (by BRICS Rankings)
3,608 staff (1,394 academic staff, 181 Doctor of Sciences, 744 Candidate of Sciences)
 Web of Science: 1583 articles, 5006 citation index, 29 h-index
 Scopus: 2425 articles, 7772 citation index, 35 h-index
 8 small innovative enterprises, 90 licenses, 7 Doctoral Committees
 More than 200,000 students graduated since its foundation
 18,396 students from various countries (562 are international)

External links 
 Official site

References 

Education in Samara, Russia
1914 establishments in the Russian Empire
Samara State Technical University
Technical universities and colleges in Russia